Björn Zikarsky (born 17 July 1967 in Erlangen) is a former freestyle swimmer from Germany, who won the bronze medal in the 4×100 m freestyle relay at the 1996 Summer Olympics in Atlanta, Georgia. He did so alongside Christian Tröger, his twin brother Bengt Zikarsky and Mark Pinger. He also competed in the 1988 Summer Olympics for West Germany.  He lives between Brisbane and the Sunshine Coast, Australia.  He has 4 kids with Kylie (Zikarsky), a former Elite Surf Lifesaving Competitor:  Ruben, Jade, Lennox and Rocco. Rocco standing 7'1 (215cm) at 16 years (July 2022) of age is a very prospective basketballer (part of the National Player Program) and, like his older brother Ruben, a national level swimmer.

References

1967 births
Living people
German male swimmers
Olympic swimmers of Germany
Olympic swimmers of West Germany
Swimmers at the 1988 Summer Olympics
Swimmers at the 1996 Summer Olympics
Olympic bronze medalists for Germany
German twins
Olympic bronze medalists in swimming
German male freestyle swimmers
Twin sportspeople
European Aquatics Championships medalists in swimming
Medalists at the 1996 Summer Olympics
Sportspeople from Erlangen
20th-century German people
21st-century German people